Barnard Hall, originally known as Student's Hall, is a historic educational building located on the campus of Barnard College in Morningside Heights, New York, New York. It was designed by Arnold W. Brunner and Buchman & Fox in 1916, and contains classrooms.  It is four stories on a raised basement built of dark red brick with white limestone and terra cotta details.  It combines Italian Renaissance massing and detail with Colonial Revival inspired features.  The front facade features a three-story limestone portico with four monumental Corinthian order columns.

The hall was listed on the National Register of Historic Places in 2003.

See also
Brooks and Hewitt Halls
Milbank, Brinckerhoff, and Fiske Halls

References

School buildings on the National Register of Historic Places in Manhattan
Colonial Revival architecture in New York City
Renaissance Revival architecture in New York City
School buildings completed in 1916
Columbia University campus
University and college buildings on the National Register of Historic Places in New York (state)
1916 establishments in New York City
Barnard College